The following is a partial list of compositions by the composer Nikolai Rimsky-Korsakov (1844–1908).

Operas
The Maid of Pskov (Псковитянка = Pskovitjanka) (sometimes referred to as Ivan the Terrible), 1868–1872 (1st version), 1876–1877 (2nd version), 1891–1892 (3rd version)
Mlada (Млада), 1872 (portions of acts 2 and 3 from project composed collectively by Borodin, Cui, Minkus, Mussorgsky, and Rimsky-Korsakov)
May Night (Майская ночь = Majskaja noch’), 1878–1879
The Snow Maiden (Снегурочка = Sneguročka), 1880–1881 (1st version), ca. 1895 (2nd version)
Mlada (Млада), 1889–1890 (complete setting of unstaged collaborative project from 1872)
Christmas Eve (Ночь перед Рождеством = Noč' pered Roždestvom), 1894–1895
Sadko (Садко), 1895–1896
Mozart and Salieri (Моцарт и Сальери = Mocart i Sal'eri), Op. 48, 1897
The Noblewoman Vera Sheloga (Боярыня Вера Шелога = Bojarynja Vera Šeloga), Op. 54, 1898
The Tsar's Bride (Царская невеста = Carskaja nevesta), 1898
The Tale of Tsar Saltan, of His Son, the Famous and Mighty Bogatyr Prince Gvidon Saltanovich, and of the Beautiful Princess Swan (Сказка о царе Салтане, о сыне его, славном и могучем богатыре князе Гвидоне Салтановиче и о прекрасной Царевне Лебеди = Skazka o care Saltane, o syne ego, slavnom i mogučem bogatyre knjaze Gvidone Saltanoviče i o prekrasnoj Carevne Lebedi), 1899–1900
Servilia (Сервилия = Servilija), 1900–1901
Kashchey the Immortal (Кащей бессмертный = Kaščej bessmertnyj), 1901–1902
Pan Voyevoda (Пан воевода = Pan vojevoda; literally, The Gentleman Provincial Governor), 1902–1903
The Legend of the Invisible City of Kitezh and the Maiden Fevroniya (Сказание о невидимом граде Китеже и деве Февронии = Skazanie o nevidimom grade Kiteže i deve Fevronii), 1903–1904
The Golden Cockerel (Золотой петушок = Zolotoj petušok), 1906–1907

Choral music

Sacred choral
(all a cappella)
"Thee, O God, We Praise" ("Тебе Бога хвалим"), for double chorus, 1883
Collection of Sacred Musical Compositions by N.A. Rimsky-Korsakov Used at the Imperial Court. Four-Voice Compositions from the Liturgy of St. John Chrysostom, Op. 22, 1883; contains 8 pieces
Collection of Sacred Musical Arrangements by N.A. Rimsky-Korsakov Used at the Imperial Court, Op. 22b, 1884; contains 6 hymns based on chant melodies
Collection of Sacred Musical Compositions and Arrangements by N.A. Rimsky-Korsakov for Mixed Chorus, 1883–1884; contains 23 pieces, published posthumously in 1913

Secular choral
(a cappella unless otherwise indicated)
Two Choruses, Op. 13, for three women's parts, 1874
Four Variations and a Fughetta on the Russian Folksong "Надоели ночи", Op. 14, for four women's parts with piano or harmonium ad lib. 1874
Six Choruses, Op. 16, variously for mixed, women's, and men's voices, 1875–1876
Two Choruses, Op. 18/22, for mixed voices, 1876
Four Choruses, Op. 23, for three men's parts with piano ad lib., 1876
Poem about Alexei, Man of God, Op. 20, for altos, tenors, and bass with orchestra, 1878
Fifteen Russian Folksongs, Op. 19, for mixed voices, 1879
"Glory" ("Слава" = "Slava"), Op. 21, for mixed voices with orchestra, 1879–1890
Two Choruses, for children's voices, 1884
Switezianka, Op. 44, cantata for soprano and tenor soloists and mixed voices with orchestra, 1897
Song of Oleg the Wise, Op. 58, cantata for tenor and bass soloists and men's voices with orchestra, 1899
From Homer, Op. 60, prelude-cantata for soprano, mezzo-soprano, and alto soloists and women's voices with orchestra, 1901

Orchestral and band music

Works for symphony orchestra
Symphony No. 1 in E minor, Op. 1, 1861–1865 (1st version), 1884 (2nd version)
Overture on Three Russian Themes, Op. 28, 1866 (1st version), 1879–1880 (2nd version)
Fantasy on Serbian Themes, Op. 6 1867 (1st version), 1886–1887 (2nd version); also called Serbian Fantasy
Sadko, Op. 5, musical tableau, 1867 (1st version), 1869 (2nd version), 1891–1892 (3rd version)
Antar, Op. 9, 1868 (1st version), 1875 (2nd version), 1897 (3rd version), 1903 (amended 2nd version published by Bessel). Originally designated "Symphony No. 2," he later reclassified it a "symphonic suite." (See Rimsky-Korsakov, My Musical Life, 92.)
Symphony No. 3 in C, Op. 32, 1866–1873 (1st version), 1886 (2nd version)
Music to Mei's drama The Maid of Pskov, suite of five numbers, 1877 (adapted from the opera as incidental music)
Fairytale [Сказка = Skazka], Op. 29, 1879–1880
Sinfonietta on Russian Themes in A minor, Op. 31, 1879–1884; adaptation of first three movements from string quartet of 1878–1879
Capriccio Espagnol, Op. 34, 1887, (Based mainly on Asturian traditional folk music themes)
Scheherazade, Op. 35, symphonic suite, 1888
Russian Easter Festival Overture (Светлый праздник), Op. 36, 1888
Theme and Variation No. 4, 1903, from collective set of variations on a Russian theme, with Artsybushev, Vitols, Lyadov, Sokolov, and Glazunov
On the Tomb, Op. 61, prelude, 1904, in memory of M.P. Belaieff
"Dubinushka", Op. 62, 1905 (1st version), 1906 (2nd version with choral parts ad lib.)
"Greeting" ["Здравица"], 1907, for Glazunov
Neapolitan Song [i.e., "Funiculi, funicula"], Op. 63, 1907

Opera excerpts for orchestral concerts
The Snow Maiden – Suite; includes "Dance of the Skomorokhi" (act 3) (also known as "Dance of the Clowns" or "Dance of the Tumblers")
Mlada
Suite; includes "Procession of the Nobles"
Night on Mount Triglav, 1899–1901; purely orchestral adaptation of act 3
Christmas Eve Suite
Includes "Polonaise" (from Christmas Eve, act 3, tableaux no. 7)
The Tale of Tsar Saltan
Suite: Three Musical Pictures, Op. 57 (1903) (The excerpts are the introductions to act 1; act 2; and act 4, tableau 2)
"Flight of the Bumblebee" (from act 3, tableau 1)
Pan Voyevoda Suite Op. 59
The Golden Cockerel
Introduction and Cortège de Noces (Wedding March)
Suite (prepared by Glazunov and M. Steinberg)
The Legend of the Invisible City of Kitezh and the Maiden Fevroniya, suite (prepared by Glazunov and M. Steinberg)
Suite; includes "Wedding Procession" (from act 2 "Little Kitezh on the Volga") & "The Battle of Kershenets" (from act 3, scene 1 "Great Kitezh")

Solo instrumental music with orchestra or band
Concerto in B, for trombone and military band, 1877
Variations in G minor on a theme by Glinka, for oboe and military band, 1878
Konzertstück in E, for clarinet and military band, 1878
Piano Concerto in C minor, Op. 30, 1882–1883
Fantasy on Two Russian Themes, for violin and orchestra, Op. 33, 1886–1887
Mazurka on [Three] Polish Folk Themes, for violin and orchestra, 1888; also called Souvenir de trois chants polonais
Serenade for cello and orchestra, Op. 37, orchestrated in 1903 from cello/piano original

Songs

Romances, other art songs and duets
(For solo voice with piano accompaniment unless otherwise indicated.)
"Butterfly" [Бабочка = Babochka], duet, 1855
"Come out to me, signora" [Выходи ко мне, синьора = Vykhodi ko mne, sin'ora], 1861
"In the blood burns the fire of desire" [В крови горит огонь любви = V krovi gorit ogon' ljubvi], 1865 (current provenance unknown)Four Songs, Op. 2, 1865–1866 (often called Four Romances)
Lean Thy Cheek to Mine
The Nightingale and the Rose (based on Persian poetry)
Lullaby (from Lev Mei's verse drama that was the basis for the opera The Maid of Pskov; incorporated later into the opera The Noblewoman Vera Sheloga)
From My Tears
Four Songs, Op. 3, 1866
Jel' i pal'ma
Juzhnaja noch'
Nochevala tuchka zolotaja
Na kholmakh Gruziji (On the hills of Georgia)
Four Songs, Op. 4, 1866
Four Songs, Op. 7, 1867
Six Songs, Op. 8, 1868–1870
Two Songs, Op. 25, 1870
Four Songs, Op. 26, 1882
Four Songs, Op. 27, 1883
Four Songs, Op. 39, 1897
Four Songs, Op. 40, 1897
Four Songs, Op. 41, 1897
Four Songs, Op. 42, 1897In Spring [Весной], Op. 43, 1897 (four songs)To the Poet [Поэту], Op. 45, 1897–1899 (five songs)By the Sea [У моря], Op. 46, 1897 (five songs)
Two Duets, Op. 47, for mezzo-soprano and baritone or soprano and tenor, 1897
Two Songs, Op. 49, for bass, 1882–1897
Four Songs, Op. 50, 1897–1898
Five Songs, Op. 51, 1898
Two Duets, Op. 52, 1897–1898Dragonflies [Стрекозы], Op. 53, for three sopranos, 1897
Four Songs, Op. 55, for tenor, 1897–1898
Two Songs, Op. 56, for soprano, 1898

Folksong collectionsCollection of One Hundred Russian Folksongs, Op. 24, 1875–1876Forty Folksongs, 1875–1882

Chamber music
String Quartet in F, Op. 12, 1875
String Sextet in A, for pairs of violins, violas, and violoncellos, 1876
Quintet in B-flat, for flute, clarinet, horn, bassoon, and piano, 1876
String Quartet on Russian Themes, 1878–1879
First three movements later adapted for Sinfonietta, Op. 31
Remaining fourth movement has title "In a Monastery" ["В монастыре"] (version for piano four-hands is entitled "In a Church")
Four Variations on a Chorale in G minor, for string quartet, 1885
String Quartet "B-la-F", 1st movement, 1886; other movements by Lyadov, Glazunov, and Borodin
String Quartet Jour de fête [Именины], finale ("Round-Dance" ["Хоровод"]), 1887; other movements by Glazunov and Lyadov
Nocturne in F, for four horns, ca. 1888
Two Duets in F, for two horns, 1883?–1894?
Canzonetta and Tarantella, for two clarinets, 1883?–1894?
Serenade, for violoncello and piano, 1893; also orchestrated as Op. 37
String Quartet in G, 1897
Trio in C minor, for violin, violoncello, and piano, 1897; completed by his son-in-law Maximilian Steinberg in 1939
Theme and Variation No. 4 in G major, for string quartet, 1898; for collaborative Variations on a Russian Theme ("Надоели ночи надоскучили"), with Artsybushev, Skriabin, Glazunov, Lyadov, Vitols, Blumenfeld, Ewald, Winkler, and Sokolov
Allegro in B-flat, for string quartet, 1899, for the collaborative set of string quartet pieces entitled Les vendredis, with Glazunov, Artsybushev, Sokolov, Lyadov, Vitols, Osten-Sacken, Blumenfeld, Borodin, and Kopylov

Piano music
Six Variations on the theme BACH, Op. 10, 1878 (Waltz, Intermezzo, Scherzo, Nocturne, Prelude and Fugue)
Four Pieces, Op. 11, 1876–1877 (Impromptus, Novelette, Scherzino, Etude)
Three Pieces, Op. 15, 1875–1876 (Waltz, Romance, Fugue)
Six Fugues, Op. 17, 1875
Two Pieces, Op. 38, 1894–1897 (Prelude-Impromptu, Mazurka)
Variations (Nos. 1, 2, 6, 11, 3, 16 and 19) and Pieces (Lullaby, Little Fugue on the theme BACH, Tarantella, Minuet, Bells [Трезвон – Trezvon], Comic Fugue) from a collaborative paraphrase to the constant theme, 1878 (without opus no)
Fugues and Fughettas, 1875–1876 (without opus no)
Allegretto in C major, 1895 (without opus no)
Prelude in G major, 1896 (without opus no)
Theme and 1st variation from collaborative variations to the Russian theme, 1899 (without opus no)
Fugue in C major for 4 hands (also: transcription in 2 hands), 1875 (without opus no)
Variations to the theme by Misha, c.1878–1879 (without opus no)
Song [Песенка = Pesenka] (Andantino) from the army collection Arzunkner, 1901 (without opus no)
Finale of the collective Joke-Quadrille for 4 hands, 1890 (without opus no)

Editing or completion of works by others

Alexander BorodinPrince Igor (completed with Glazunov)

César CuiWilliam Ratcliff (orchestrated several passages for first performance in 1869)

Alexander DargomyzhskyThe Stone Guest (orchestration only; composition finished by César Cui)

Mikhail GlinkaA Life for the Tsar (edited with Mily Balakirev and Anatoly Lyadov)Ruslan and Lyudmila (edited with Balakirev and Lyadov)
Complete Orchestral Works (edited with Balakirev and Lyadov)

Modest MussorgskyBoris GodunovKhovanshchinaSongs and Dances of Death (orchestration only)Night on Bald MountainBibliography
 Rimsky-Korsakov, N.A. The Complete Sacred Choral Works. Monuments of Russian Sacred Music, Series III. Madison, CT: Musica Russica, 1999.
 ___. Полное собрание сочинений [Complete [sic] Collection of Works'']. Москва, 1946–1970. (Reprinted by Kalmus/Belwin Mills.)
 Walker, Marina Frolova, "'Rimsky-Korsakov: (1) Nikolay Andreyevich Rimsky-Korsakov", Grove Music Online (subscription required), (Accessed 8 December 2005)

External links
 List of Rimsky-Korsakov's works at Staratel 
 List of Rimsky-Korsakov's works at Russisches Musikarchiv 
 
 "Texts to Art Songs and Choral Works by N. Rimsky-Korsakov", lieder.net

Rimsky-Korsakov, Nikolai